The Bayer designation Tau Gruis (τ Gru / τ Gruis) is shared by two stars and a star system, in the constellation Grus:
τ¹ Gruis (HD 216435)
τ² Gruis (HD 216656)
τ³ Gruis (HD 216823)

Gruis, Tau
Grus (constellation)